The Rip Van Winkle Bridge is a  cantilever bridge
spanning the Hudson River between Hudson, New York and Catskill, New York. Affording  of clearance over the water, the structure carries NY 23 across the river, connecting US 9W and NY 385 on the west side with NY 9G on the east side.  The bridge is named after the 1819 short story of the same name by Washington Irving, which mentions Hudson and Catskill.

Construction

The bridge was built by the newly created New York State Bridge Authority, opening on July 2, 1935, at a cost of $2.4 million ($ with inflation). 

A fireworks display marked the 50th anniversary of the bridge's construction in 1985. 

A multi-year repainting project was completed in 2009 which removed all lead-based paint.

Pedestrian walkway
A pedestrian walkway was completed in 2018 on the south side of the bridge, open from dawn to dusk.  Bicyclists may use the roadway or walk their bikes across the pedestrian walkway.  The walkway is also a link on the Hudson River Skywalk, which links the homes of Hudson River School painters Thomas Cole and Frederic Church.

Tolls
Upon its opening, the toll was $0.80 ($ with inflation) per passenger car and $0.10 ($ with inflation) per passenger up to $1 ($ with inflation). Originally, tolls were collected in both directions. In August 1970, the toll was abolished for westbound drivers, and at the same time, eastbound drivers saw their tolls doubled. The tolls of eleven other New York–New Jersey and Hudson River crossings along a  stretch, from the Outerbridge Crossing in the south to the Rip Van Winkle Bridge in the north, were also changed to eastbound-only at that time. 

In 2019, the bridge authority announced that tolls on its Hudson River crossings would increase each year beginning in 2020 and ending in 2023. As of May 1, 2021, the current toll for passenger cars traveling eastbound on the Mid-Hudson Bridge was $1.75 in cash, $1.45 for E-ZPass users. In May 2022, tolls will rise to $1.55 for E-ZPass users and $2 for toll by mail payers. In 2023, the E-ZPass toll will increase to $1.65, and the mailed toll will rise to $2.15  

At midnight on November 1, 2021, the bridge was converted to all-electronic tolling.

See also
List of fixed crossings of the Hudson River

References

External links and Resources
Photosphere from Rip Van Winkle Bridge Walkway
New York State Bridge Authority - Official site
Historical Overview: Rip Van Winkle Bridge - NYCRoads.com
 

Bridges completed in 1935
Bridges over the Hudson River
New York State Bridge Authority
Road bridges in New York (state)
Toll bridges in New York (state)
Cantilever bridges in the United States
Truss bridges in the United States
Catskill, New York
Hudson, New York
Hudson River School sites